Sekhari or Shekhari is a type of northern Indian shikhara (tower or spire on top of a shrine) which comprises a central Latina spire with urushringa half spires added on all sides. It is a one of two sub-types of shikhara, the other being bhumija.

Notes

References
Tadgell, Chistopher, The East: Buddhists, Hindus and the Sons of Heaven, 2015, Routledge, 9781136753831, google books

Hindu temple architecture